Eastburn is a hamlet in the East Riding of Yorkshire, England, it forms part of the civil parish of Kirkburn.

In 1823 Eastburn was in the parish of Kirkburn, the Wapentake of Harthill, and had a population of 12, which included a yeoman.

References

External links

"Kirkburn: Geographical and Historical information from the year 1892 (Bulmers')", (Includes Eastburn) Genuki.org.uk. Retrieved 16 April 2012

Villages in the East Riding of Yorkshire